Yarlet School, formerly Yarlet Hall, is a coeducational preparatory school located in the district of Yarlet,  north of the county town Stafford in Staffordshire, England.

History
The school was founded by Reverend Walter Earle, former Second Master at Uppingham School, as a small prep school for boys in Yarlet Hall, a Victorian private house situated in the countryside on the outskirts of Stafford. Hence, Yarlet had close ties with Uppingham early in its history and indeed, many of the boys continued their schooling at Uppingham. Earle founded Bilton Grange in Warwickshire and later moved there in 1887, taking some of the boys with him, but the original school in Yarlet continued to function under a new headmaster. Ties were also established with Rugby School, which remain to this day. It became a charitable trust in 1970. The pre-prep department was opened in 1993. Girls were admitted in 1994 and the school is now fully coeducational.

Curriculum
Subjects taught in Year 3 and above include English, Mathematics, Science, ICT, French, History, Geography, Religious Studies, Latin and Music. Pupils are prepared for the Common Entrance Exam which is taken at the end of Year 8.

Sport
Yarlet has beautiful grounds and a wide range of facilities such as an AstroTurf pitch, three tennis courts, two football/rugby/rounders pitches, and three tennis courts, two of which can be used for netball. This gives a large availability of sport at Yarlet. Boys play football in the autumn term, rugby in the spring, and cricket in the summer. Girls play hockey in the autumn, netball in the spring, and rounders in the summer. Athletics, swimming and tennis are also available.

Boarding
There is no full-time boarding. A flexi-boarding option is also available which allows children to board on Wednesday and Thursday nights. It is closer to a sleep over than full-time boarding and fun activities are arranged for boarding evenings. Since 2009 Yarlet has run a "combined scholarship" programme with several reputable private senior schools to allow deserving children from financially disadvantaged backgrounds to board at Yarlet and then transfer to the senior schools as full boarders after completing their studies at Yarlet.

Headmasters
There have only been eight headmasters (including the incumbent) in the school's history.

Walter Earle (1873-1887)
Clement W L Bode (1887-1902)
Andrew F Fernie (1903-1929)
Guy C N Mackarness (1929-1937)
Keith E Tarling (1937-1970)
David N Carr (1970-1989)
Richard S Plant (1989-2009)
Ian M Raybould (2009–present)

Former Pupils
John Buxton, academic
Norman Douglas, author
Giles Foden, author
Nick Hancock, comedian and host
Andy Richards, musician, composer and organist

See also
Yarlet Hall School (1986) on Domesday Reloaded

References

External links
School Website
Profile on the ISC website
Profile on the Good Schools Guide

Preparatory schools in Staffordshire
Boarding schools in Staffordshire
Educational institutions established in 1873
1873 establishments in England